The Boris Trajkovski Sports Center in Skopje is a multi-functional indoor sports arena. It is located in the Karpoš Municipality of Skopje, North Macedonia.

It is named after the former president, Boris Trajkovski, who died in a plane crash in 2004. It has a maximum seating capacity of 7,000 for handball, 7,500 for basketball and 10,000 for concerts. The venue also contains four restaurants and a sports bar. The arena is home to the North Macedonia national basketball team (men and women), North Macedonia men's national handball team (men and women) and North Macedonia national volleyball team (men and women).

History
Construction began in June 2004 with the city of Skopje as the main investor. It was introduced as one of the capital projects of former mayor Risto Penov. The initial term set by the city authorities for the completion was one year, but it was repeatedly set back by problems during construction. At the beginning, while digging the foundation, underground water broke and the whole site was flooded. This brought additional costs of around one million euros, on several occasions the city coffers remained low, which at times led to stoppage of the resumption of the construction work.

Upon arrival by Trifun Kostovski as mayor, the city began negotiations with the government to hand over the facility in their jurisdiction. Negotiations were conducted with the previous government but had ended unsuccessfully. In February 2007, the government signed an agreement for the handover. A joint stock company "Boris Trajkovski" was established to manage the facility, with each investor receiving an appropriate number of shares by the money they invested for the final construction.

The Harlem Globetrotters, were first to perform at the arena following the opening ceremony on 22 May 2008. In 2011, a hockey rink and karting track were opened. The government had funded most of the investment, which was worth 430,000 euros.

It was one of two venues used for the 2008 European Women's Handball Championship and it will be used again in the 2022 European Women's Handball Championship which will host the preliminary and main rounds with Slovenia and Montenegro.

Held and scheduled events

Gallery

See also
 List of indoor arenas in North Macedonia

References

External links

 

Handball venues in North Macedonia
Indoor arenas in North Macedonia
S
Basketball venues in North Macedonia
Volleyball venues in North Macedonia